A pavilion is a type of building. 

Pavilion or Pavillion may also refer to:

Places

United States
Pavilion, New York, a town
Pavilion (CDP), New York, census-designated place within the town
Pavillion, Wyoming, a town

Canada
Pavilion, British Columbia, a ranching community and First Nations community
Pavilion Indian Band, a First Nations government in British Columbia
Pavilion Lake, a lake near Pavilion, British Columbia
Pavilion Mountain, a mountain in British Columbia

Named structures

United Kingdom
London Pavilion, a shopping arcade
Royal Pavilion, a former royal residence in Brighton

United States
The Pavilion (UC Davis), home to the UC Davis Aggies men's and women's basketball teams
The Pavilion at Ole Miss, home to the Ole Miss Rebels men's and women's basketball teams
The Pavilion (Scranton, Pennsylvania), an outdoor amphitheater within the Montage Mountain Ski Resort
The Pavilion (Vermont), the principal workplace of the governor of Vermont
Finneran Pavilion, formerly The Pavilion, home to the Villanova Wildcats men's and women's basketball teams
Myrtle Beach Pavilion in Myrtle Beach, South Carolina

Elsewhere
Pavilion Kuala Lumpur, a shopping mall in Kuala Lumpur, Malaysia
Pavilion, Singapore, former Government House.
The Pavilion (mall), a shopping mall in Westville, South Africa
The Pavilion (Halifax), a former all-ages music venue

Other uses
"Pavilion" (song), by Eric Johnson from Venus Isle
Pavilion (TV series), a 1967 Canadian travel documentary series
Pavilion (co-working business club), a British business members' group
Pavilion Books, a U.K. publisher imprint owned by Anova Books
Pavilions (supermarket), a California supermarket chain owned by Safeway
Cricket pavilion, a building at a cricket ground
HP Pavilion, Hewlett-Packard's brand name of computers and notebooks
Umbraculum or the pavilion, an historic piece of the papal regalia and insignia
The Pavilion, a play by Craig Wright
Pavilion, the lower part of a faceted gemstone
Pavilion, a physical space for networking and business operated by Hub Culture
Pavilion (video game)

See also
Pavilion Theatre (disambiguation)
Pavilions Shopping Centre (disambiguation)
Pavillon (disambiguation)